Ram Sahai was an Indian politician. He was a Member of Parliament, representing Madhya  Pradesh in the Rajya Sabha the upper house of India's Parliament as a member of the Indian National Congress. He was a member of the Constituent Assembly of India representing Madhya Bharat.

References

Rajya Sabha members from Madhya  Pradesh
Indian National Congress politicians
1895 births
Members of the Constituent Assembly of India
Year of death missing